Pip Ivan is the third highest peak (after Hoverla and Brebeneskul) in the Chornohora (Czarnohora) range, with a height of 2022 meters (6,634 ft) above sea level.

In the interwar period (1918–1939) the peak marked the Polish - Czechoslovak, from March 1939 Polish - Hungarian border and numerous skirmishes between OUN and Polish border troops took place in the area.

On the peak (then in Polish called Pop Iwan), from 1936–1938 the Polish government built an astronomical and meteorological observatory, which was commonly called "Biały Słoń" ("White Elephant").

Observatory history
In 1936, the Ministry of Air Defense of Poland laid the first stone for the observatory's foundation on Pip Ivan.

Stone and wood were brought to a height of 2028 meters from the neighboring villages, and the equipment was brought from all over the world. Hutsuls worked mainly on construction. The scale of the project was enormous, and the working conditions were strenuous: 800 tons of building materials were delivered by train to Vorokhta (70 km from the village to the foot of the mountain), then the workers had to carry the material on horses and also on their backs to the very top. It became necessary to build a high-altitude road.

Engineers made it possible for researchers and servicemen to stay on the mountain throughout the year. Water pipes were connected to the observatory. Since in the winter there could be up to several meters of snow with temperatures falling to -40 degrees, the building even had its own heating system - for this purpose, a boiler room was equipped in the technical premises.

On the way to Pip Ivan, the scientists were sometimes caught in avalanches - to the point where the military was summoned to search for them.

The thickness of the walls reaches 1.25 m; in order to help warm it, the builders added an elongated layer of material, which came from Africa.

In July 1938 the observatory was opened. It consisted of the hotel, business facilities, and astronomical tower. The hotel had 2 levels on the east side, and 5 on the western side. On the first floor screw-mounted stairs led to the tower itself. Atop the tower, a giant copper cast dome with a diameter of 10 meters was installed.

The entire building was built with 43 rooms and 57 windows. Bread was baked on-site, and food stocks had to be renewed only twice a year. The observatory had its own greenhouses, with conditions suitable for growing vegetables. The capabilities of the communications facility were minimal.

The main equipment in the observatory was the astrograph, whose lens was 33 cm in diameter. It was imported from Edinburgh. Thanks to the astrograph, scientists were able to study large and small planets and comets, and observe and photograph various stars.

The telescope was driven by automatically-regulated engines equipped with an ultra-precision timer. The dome of the tower had its own electric motors.

With the start of the Second World War, the observatory began a period of decline. The research station personnel were urgently evacuated, while sensitive equipment was dismantled and taken away.

In 1939, when Chornohora became a part of the USSR, attempts were made to continue the study of the weather, but after two years, all experimental activity on Pip Ivan was stopped. In 1941, the top of the mountain was initially used as an observation point by Hungarian troops. Since 1944, this stone viewpoint has been abandoned to the elements.

The walls of the building are so strong that they have stood for more than 70 years without any additional care or repair: the observation center has almost no internal walls - some were destroyed by people, while others collapsed on their own. In 2012, the restoration of the premises began. As of 2014, the roof has been replaced, floors, strong doors, and metal-plastic windows were installed, and a fireplace was built. Plans also included the restoration of a stone fence that previously surrounded the observatory, in order to install solar cells on it to electrify the building.

Today, the former observatory is a popular destination for many tourists.

References

Mountains of Ukraine
Mountains of the Eastern Carpathians
Two-thousanders of Ukraine